Ter is a dispersed settlement in the hills northeast of Ljubno ob Savinji in Slovenia. The area belongs to the traditional region of Styria and it is now included in the Savinja Statistical Region.

References

External links
Ter on Geopedia

Populated places in the Municipality of Ljubno